Santuario de Quillacas is a small town in the Oruro Department in Bolivia. It is situated south east of Poopó Lake.

See also 
 Kuntur Chukuña

References

 ine.gob.bo

Populated places in Oruro Department